The Lights of Baku is a 1950 Soviet drama film directed by Iosif Kheifits, Rza Tahmasib and Aleksandr Zarkhi. The film portrays workers in the oil fields of Azerbaijan during the Second World War, when they were of great strategic importance. Scenes featuring Mikheil Gelovani as Joseph Stalin were later cut after the dictator's death when his cult of personality had come under attack from the new Soviet leadership.

The film's sets were designed by the art director Mikhail Yuferov.

Cast

References

Bibliography 
 Rollberg, Peter. Historical Dictionary of Russian and Soviet Cinema. Scarecrow Press, 2008.

External links 
 

1950 films
Soviet drama films
1950 drama films
1950s Russian-language films
Films set in Baku
Films directed by Rza Tahmasib
Soviet black-and-white films